Besides the novels of The Dresden Files, author Jim Butcher has written several shorter works appearing in the same universe. Most are told from the point of view of Harry Dresden, as are the novels, but some take the point of view of other characters.

Works

"Something Borrowed"
While getting fitted for his role as best man to William Borden as the latter marries his long-time girlfriend Georgia, Harry Dresden discovers that Georgia has gone missing, and goes looking for her. With the help of Karrin Murphy, he manages to bring her back to the wedding, unconscious and under a spell, only to find that Jenny Greenteeth has taken Georgia's place at the wedding. Dresden manages to convince William to awake his rightful partner, to disastrous results for Jenny Greenteeth.

Set between Dead Beat and Proven Guilty, Something Borrowed was published in My Big Fat Supernatural Wedding (October 3, 2006).

"It's My Birthday, Too"
On Valentine's Day, Harry Dresden remembers he has got a birthday present for his brother Thomas Raith and arranges to meet him at the Woodfield Mall in Schaumburg, where Thomas is taking part in a vampire-themed LARP. The play is disrupted by a revenant, an old friend of the players who turned into a Black Court vampire to seek revenge.

Set between White Night and Small Favor, It's My Birthday, Too was published in Many Bloody Returns (September 4, 2007).

"Heorot"
Harry Dresden has been alerted that a young bride has disappeared from the Night of Living Brews just hours after her wedding, along with a cask of mead. Dresden and Mouse set to find her. They are joined by Ms. Gard only to find that the young woman has been kidnapped by a descendant of Grendel, who needs mead in order to breed a child of his own. Dresden and Gard make short work of the grendelkin and bring back the bride to her rightful husband.

Set between White Night and Small Favor, "Heorot" was published in My Big Fat Supernatural Honeymoon (December 26, 2007). It was also reprinted in Side Jobs.

"Harry's Day Off"
Harry Dresden has finally a day off his many commitments and responsibilities, and plans to use it for a date with Anastasia Luccio. Dresden's so carefully laid plans, however, are disrupted by Molly Carpenter needing a lesson in potion-making, and by Andi and Kirby needing a thorough cleansing to get rid of psychophagic mites.

Set between Small Favor and Turn Coat, Harry's Day Off was published in Blood Lite (October 21, 2008). It was later reprinted in Side Jobs as Day Off.

"Backup"
Dresden is hot on the trail of a kidnapped child, when Thomas Raith is alerted that a member of the Stygian Sisterhood is in town. His job is to stop and kill her, before she can complete her activities. In the chase, Thomas finds that she is behind the child's kidnapping, and that her purpose is to bring Harry down. He manages, all the while keeping his brother unaware of the fact. Narrated from Thomas Raith's point of view.

Set between Small Favor and Turn Coat, Backup was published independently by Subterranean Press. It featured artwork by Mike Mignola. It was later reprinted in Side Jobs without Mignola's artwork.

"The Warrior"
Pictures of Michael Carpenter's family are being sent to Harry Dresden. Unsure of their meaning but feeling that his friend and his friend's family are in danger, Harry warns Michael to stay alert and begs him to pick up the sword Amoracchius again. Michael refuses, aware that, once put down, a Sword of the Cross can't be picked up again. An attempt to steal the swords is unsuccessful, but a few pictures of the perpetrator are taken. Later on, Alicia, one of Michael's daughters, is kidnapped to try to force the surrender of the swords. The delivery fails, leading to the capture of the perpetrator, a priest.

Set between Small Favor and Turn Coat, The Warrior was published in Mean Streets (January 6, 2009). It was later reprinted in Side Jobs.

"Last Call"
A spell is placed on MacAnally's famed beer in order to control the spectators to a sport's game at the United Center in Chicago. Dresden and Murphy manage to link it back to Meditrina Bassarid, a maenad, and, with difficulty, they manage to subdue her.

Set between Small Favor and Turn Coat, Last Call was published in Strange Brew (July 7, 2009). It was later reprinted in Side Jobs.

"AAAA Wizardry"
Harry Dresden instructs a class of young Wardens on methods for investigating supernatural phenomena, using one of his own past cases as an example. He describes the four A's of his technique (Ascertain, Analysis, Assemble, Act), but warns them to beware of a fifth A (Arrogance).

Set between the May following Small Favor and the events of Turn Coat, "AAAA Wizardry" was published in Volume Two: Our World of "The Dresden Files Roleplaying Game" (June 15, 2010). It was later reprinted in Brief Cases.

"Even Hand"
On a mission for Lara Raith, Justine visits Johnny Marcone to request shelter for herself and a child under the terms of the Unseelie Accords. Marcone reluctantly agrees to harbor her for the child's sake, using a formidable range of magical and mundane weaponry to stop the Fomor pursuing them. In the aftermath of the battle, Marcone reflects on the effectiveness of his defenses and how he plans to use them against Harry Dresden in the future. Narrated by Marcone.

Set between Turn Coat and Changes, "Even Hand" was published in Dark and Stormy Knights (July 20, 2010). It was later reprinted in Brief Cases.

"Restoration of Faith"
While working as a private investigator, Harry Dresden finds a runaway he'd been hired to locate, a young girl named Faith. When he calls in his success to his partner, he learns that the girl's parents have reported her as being kidnapped to save face, and they plan to accuse him of the crime. Harry decides to bring the girl in anyway, but is stopped by a troll which has taken up residence under a bridge he needs to cross. When he confronts the troll, he is unexpectedly aided by a uniformed police woman by the name of Karrin Murphy. Dresden manages to win the fight, and with officer Murphy's aid, ensures that the girl is returned safely to her family.

Set before Storm Front, Restoration of Faith was published on Jim Butcher's web site. It was later reprinted in Side Jobs.

"Publicity and Advertising"
Bob and Harry have a discussion about how to write a Yellow Pages ad for Harry Dresden's business. Bob thinks that Harry's ad copy is boring and uninteresting, while Harry dismisses Bob's suggestions as deceptive or unbelievable. Eventually, Harry wins out and goes back to working on formulas. Formulae.

Set between Death Masks and Blood Rites, Publicity and Advertising was published on Jim Butcher's web site. It was later reprinted in Side Jobs as Vignette.

"Aftermath"
Harry Dresden has just been shot, and the police are checking the scene of the crime on Thomas Raith's boat. Karrin Murphy joins them only to hear that the body has not been found. Not really accepting the fact that he's dead, Murphy starts moving on with her life, strengthening her contacts in Chicago's supernatural community and trying to do her duty as both a policewoman and as a member of the supernatural group. In the meanwhile, a number of splinter groups is trying to step in the vampire Red Court, the Fomors being the most successful. The story was narrated by Karrin Murphy.

Set between Changes and Ghost Story, Aftermath was published exclusively in Side Jobs (October 26, 2010).

"Love Hurts"
Karrin Murphy calls Harry Dresden in on a series of weird double suicides, and they find that all the dead can be linked to a carnival outside Chicago, prompting further investigation. A Red Court vampire is discovered there, casting spells on couples, forcing them to fall in love. Since love is a mortal's sole defense against being fed upon by a member of the White Court, widespread use of the spell would cause the White Court's food supply to dwindle, giving advantage to the Red Court.

Set between Turn Coat and Changes, Love Hurts was published in Songs of Love and Death (November 16, 2010). It was later reprinted in Side Jobs.

"Curses"
Harry is hired to look into the Curse of the Billy Goat, which has plagued the Chicago Cubs in the postseason for decades, and try to lift it if possible. The case leads him to the king of the Tylwyth Teg, who cast the curse himself and has been renewing it every year. After a friendly talk with the king, a longtime Cubs fan, Harry decides not to interfere and risk costing the team its loyal fan base.

Set between Small Favor and Turn Coat, Curses was published in Naked City: Tales of Urban Fantasy (July 5, 2011). It was later reprinted in Brief Cases.

"I Was a Teenage Bigfoot"
The teenage scion of a Sasquatch and a woman, Irwin Pounder is virtually immune to disease. When his parents learn that he has fallen ill at the boarding school he attends, they hire Harry to find out if something is wrong. Harry visits Irwin and discovers that someone is using dark magic to drain energy from his aura. The culprit proves to be the school's headmaster, who has been magically regrowing his hair to reverse his baldness. Harry orders him to stop or face reprisals from the White Council, and Irwin quickly recovers.

Set between Dead Beat and Proven Guilty, I Was a Teenage Bigfoot was published in Blood Lite 3: Aftertaste (May 29, 2012). It was later reprinted in Brief Cases and Working for Bigfoot.

"Bigfoot on Campus"
Strength of a River in His Shoulders, a Bigfoot, asks Harry to look in on his half-human son Irwin Pounder, who is attending college and playing football. Harry discovers that Irwin's girlfriend Connie is a White Court vampire whose powers have little effect on him. When her father tries to psychically force her to have sex with Irwin and fatally drain his life force, Harry and River Shoulders intervene to save them both. Irwin meets his father for the first time, the price Harry set for helping, and he and Connie quietly disappear from campus.

Set between Turn Coat and Changes, Bigfoot on Campus was published in Hex Appeal (June 5, 2012). It was later reprinted in Brief Cases and Working for Bigfoot.

"B is for Bigfoot"
Strength of a River in His Shoulders is a Bigfoot who has a son, Irwin Pounder, by an archaeologist he met during a dig. When River learns that Irwin is being bullied at school, he worries about the boy's safety and hires Harry Dresden to investigate. Harry learns that Irwin's tormentors are under the protection of a svartalf who threatens to kill Harry if he interferes, but Harry finds a way for Irwin to solve the problem on his own.

Set between Fool Moon and Grave Peril, B is for Bigfoot was published in Under My Hat: Tales From the Cauldron (August 28, 2012). It was later reprinted in Brief Cases and Working for Bigfoot.

"Bombshells"
In the months after Harry Dresden's death, Molly Carpenter is on the run, living on the road and keeping under the White Council's radar, all the while being tutored by the Leanansidhe on the arts of survival and magical fighting. Encounters and skirmishes with the Fomor are increasingly frequent, until the Leanansidhe sends her in a mission to Svartalfheim in order to rescue Thomas Raith from execution. Molly discovers that a treaty of neutrality between the Fomors and the Svartalves is to be signed in a few hours and that the Fomor mean to explode a bomb during the ceremony causing numerous deaths, and sets out to prevent it. Her life turns for the better after succeeding. Narrated by Molly Carpenter.

Set between Changes and Ghost Story, Bombshells was published in Dangerous Women (December 3, 2013 ). It was later reprinted in Brief Cases.

"Jury Duty"
After receiving a summons to jury duty, Harry must save an innocent defendant from being the victim of a proxy war between Gentleman Johnny Marcone and Lara Raith.

Jury Duty was published in Unbound. Set after Skin Game, it was later reprinted in Brief Cases.

"Cold Case"
Set between Cold Days and Skin Game, Cold Case was published in Shadowed Souls. It was later reprinted in Brief Cases.

"Day One"
During training for his new role as a Knight of the Cross, Waldo Butters successfully meets his first challenge fighting a rogue baku.

Day One was published in the anthology Unfettered II. Set after Skin Game, it was later reprinted in Brief Cases.

"A Fistful of Warlocks"
Anastasia Luccio, a Warden for the White Council, is pursuing a few dangerous characters and ends up in Dodge City, home of Wyatt Earp.

A Fistful of Warlocks was published in the anthology Straight Outta Tombstone. It is set in the late 1800s. It was later reprinted in Brief Cases.

"Zoo Day"
Harry, his daughter Maggie, and his dog Mouse try to enjoy a day at the zoo, only for each to face a supernatural threat - a young warlock for Harry, a pack of haunts for Maggie, and Mouse's discovery that his own brother is orchestrating events to target them both. A Rashomon-style story told alternately from each character's separate point of view.

Set after Skin Game, Zoo Day was published exclusively in Brief Cases (June 5, 2018).

"Christmas Eve"
On Christmas Eve, Harry Dresden is struggling to assemble a bicycle as a gift for his daughter Maggie, and his dog Mouse tries to help him. He receives three visitors, all bearing various gifts. First is Queen Mab, who gives him a ring for Maggie; it will grant her some influence over the forces of Winter for one day and play "Let It Go" from the Disney film Frozen. Next is Molly, with news that the medical and funeral expenses for all the victims of the previous summer's battle against Ethniu have been paid in full. Finally, Donar Vadderung (in his mantle of Kringle, the real Santa Claus) brings Harry a coffee mug he had given his father for Christmas, evoking warm holiday memories of his childhood. Maggie wakes up just in time to see Vadderung disappear up the chimney and fly off into the night with his sleigh and team of reindeer.

Set after Battle Ground, Christmas Eve was published on author's website in blog post New Short Story: Christmas Eve at December 25, 2018. The publication was supposed to be available on December 24, but due to the large number of readers the site was crashed. To solve that problem the story was moved to Google Docs.

One year later, Christmas Eve was republished in an illustrated edition on the author's blog in post Christmas Eve 2019, with illustrations by Adam Mathison-Sward and art direction by Priscilla Spencer. The story was made available on Google Drive.

This story was republished in Battle Ground.

"Monsters"
Goodman Grey accepts a cleaning job from John Marcone - a competing criminal cartel has opened a brothel in Marcone's territory against his rules and interests.

Monsters was published in the anthology Parallel Worlds.

The story is set after Skin Game.

"Mike"
Harry Dresden brings his car to Mike Atagi for repairs, and is offered a choice among "cheap", "fast" and "good".

Set between White Night and Small Favor, Mike is a microfiction, and was published on author's website in blog post Welcome to the Year of Dresden! as part of the "Year of Dresden" celebration for The Dresden Files 20th anniversary.

"Journal"
Donald Morgan muses about his relationship to Harry Dresden.

Set at the time of Turn Coat, Journal is a microfiction, and was published on author's website in blog post Morgan Microfiction, RPG Art, and More! as part of the "Year of Dresden" celebration for The Dresden Files 20th anniversary.

"Goodbye"
Jared Kincaid is hired to shoot Harry Dresden. For this, The Archive informs him that his services will no longer be required.

Set at the end of Changes, Goodbye is a microfiction, and was published on author's website in blog post Microfiction #3, Con Swap, and Virtual Signing as part of the "Year of Dresden" celebration for The Dresden Files 20th anniversary.

"Job Placement"
Irwin Pounder and Connie Barrowill contemplate a new job and their futures together.

Taking place after Skin Game, Job Placement is a microfiction, and was published in the blog post Job Placement as part of the "Year of Dresden" celebration for The Dresden Files 20th anniversary.

"Everything the Light Touches"
Mister, Dresden's cat, thinks about the people in his life as he goes through a relaxing day.

"Everything the Light Touches" is a microfiction, and was published in the blog post Everything the Light Touches as part of the "Year of Dresden" celebration for The Dresden Files 20th anniversary.

"The Good People"
Molly Carpenter and Kringle deliver gifts to people of Chicago. Narrated by Molly Carpenter.

Set concurrently with Christmas Eve, The Good People is a microfiction, and was published in the blog post The Good People as part of the "Year of Dresden" celebration for The Dresden Files 20th anniversary.

"Little Things"
Toot-Toot discovers an invader unbeknownst to the wizard Harry Dresden and in order to defeat it, he'll have to team up with the dread cat Mister.

"Little Things" was published in the anthology Heroic Hearts.

"The Law"
Dresden and Marcone enter into battle; both the legal kind and the kind with explosions.

The Law is a novella and audiobook from Jim Butcher, with Butcher narrating the story. The audiobook was released exclusively through Audible, while a limited print version was released through Subterranean Press.

Stories by internal chronology

Dresden Drop - Microfiction published on the author's website "Year of Dresden", a 20th anniversary of the publication of the first book in The Dresden Files, Storm Front.

Collections

Side Jobs 

Side Jobs was published on October 26, 2010 as a collection of most of the existing short stories in the series at the time. All of the short stories published therein took place between novels, and were ordered chronologically. Aftermath, the final novella in the collection, was first included in this publication and is set after the novel Changes.

Story order
 "A Restoration of Faith"
 "Vignette" (aka "Publicity and Advertising")
 "Something Borrowed"
 "It's My Birthday, Too"
 "Heorot"
 "Day Off"
 "Backup"
 "The Warrior"
 "Last Call"
 "Love Hurts"
 "Aftermath"

Working for Bigfoot 

Working for Bigfoot was published on June 30, 2015. It is a collection of novellas, previously published in other anthologies, about Harry working for Bigfoot to help when his half human son gets into trouble.

Story order
 "B Is for Bigfoot"
 "I Was a Teenage Bigfoot"
 "Bigfoot on Campus"

Brief Cases 

Brief Cases was published on June 5, 2018 as a collection of Dresden Files short stories. The stories take place between the events of the novels in the series and are arranged in chronological order. Zoo Day, the final novella in the collection, was first included in this publication and is set after the novel Skin Game.

Story order
 "A Fistful of Warlocks"
 "B is for Bigfoot"
 "I Was a Teenage Bigfoot"
 "Curses"
 "AAAA Wizardry"
 "Bigfoot on Campus"
 "Even Hand"
 "Bombshells"
 "Cold Case"
 "Jury Duty"
 "Day One"
 "Zoo Day"

References

 
Works by Jim Butcher